is a Japanese badminton player.

Achievements

Summer Universiade 
Men's doubles

BWF World Junior Championships 
Boys' doubles

Asian Junior Championships 
Boys' doubles

BWF World Tour (1 runner-up)
The BWF World Tour, which was announced on 19 March 2017 and implemented in 2018, is a series of elite badminton tournaments sanctioned by the Badminton World Federation (BWF). The BWF World Tour is divided into levels of World Tour Finals, Super 1000, Super 750, Super 500, Super 300 (part of the HSBC World Tour), and the BWF Tour Super 100.

Men's doubles

BWF International Challenge/Series (4 runners-up) 
Men's doubles

  BWF International Challenge tournament
  BWF International Series tournament
  BWF Future Series tournament

References

External links
 

1997 births
Living people
Sportspeople from Gunma Prefecture
Japanese male badminton players
Universiade medalists in badminton
Universiade silver medalists for Japan
Medalists at the 2017 Summer Universiade
21st-century Japanese people